King Price Insurance is a South African-based, privately held insurance company that offers short term insurance. The company is best known for its monthly decreasing car insurance premium model.

History
King Price Insurance was founded by Gideon Galloway. The company received its initial funding from Francois van Niekerk of Mertech group and Stefan van der Walt of Nikon, and was launched in 2012. The company offered monthly insurance, reducing premiums that decrease with the depreciating value of the asset. King Price Insurance registered with as a member of the South African Insurance Crime Bureau (SAICB). King Price insurance is reinsured by reinsurer Munich RE. The company’s head offices is located at the Waterkloof Glen, Pretoria.

Product
King Price Insurance offers covers for short term insurance products including car, household, building, specialised items, trailers, caravans and all risk insurance. It offers car insurance premiums that decrease monthly according to the continuously depreciating value of the insured vehicle.

Awards
King Price won dual awards for Best Short-Term Insurer and Best Overall Newcomer in the 2013 South African Service Awards.

References

External links
 Official website

Financial services companies established in 2012
Insurance companies of South Africa
Companies based in the City of Tshwane